Heini Adams (born 29 May 1980 in Worcester, South Africa) is a professional rugby union player. He currently plays for Union Bordeaux Begles in the Top 14. His first tour with the Springboks was to France, Italy, Ireland and England in the 2009 end of year rugby tests. Before moving to France, Adams played for the South African Super Rugby side the Blue Bulls. He plays at scrum-half. He is known for his anticipation in defence and quick distribution of the ball from behind the scrum.

From June 2010 until 2015, he joined Bordeaux in France, ending his international career. In 2017 he joined the coaching staff of the French Barbarians to play South African A.

Honours 

Blue Bulls
Currie Cup: 2006 (shared), 2009
Bulls
Super Rugby: 2009

References

External links 
from SARugby
From thebulls.co.za

1980 births
Living people
Blue Bulls players
Bulls (rugby union) players
Expatriate rugby union players in France
Rugby union players from Worcester, South Africa
Rugby union scrum-halves
South Africa international rugby union players
South African expatriate rugby union players
South African expatriate sportspeople in France
South African rugby union coaches
South African rugby union players
Union Bordeaux Bègles players